is a passenger railway station located in the city of Takamatsu, Kagawa Prefecture, Japan. It is operated by JR Shikoku and has the station number "T25".

Lines
The station is served by the JR Shikoku Kōtoku Line and is located 4.3 km from the beginning of the line at Takamatsu.

Layout
Ritsurin Station consists of an island platform serving two tracks. Track 1 is the through-track while track 2 is a passing loop. The station building is part of the elevated structure. Level 1 houses shops. The waiting room and a JR ticket window (with a Midori no Madoguchi facility) are located on level 2. Stairs and an escalator lead to the island platform on level 3. A large designated parking area for bikes is provided outside the station.

History
At that time the station was operated by Japanese Government Railways, later becoming Japanese National Railways (JNR). With the privatization of JNR on 1 April 1987, control of the station passed to JR Shikoku.

Surrounding area
 Takamatsu First High School
 Takamatsu Municipal Sakuramachi Junior High Schoo

See also
List of railway stations in Japan

References

External links

Ritsurin Station (JR Shikoku)

Railway stations in Kagawa Prefecture
Railway stations in Japan opened in 1925
Railway stations in Takamatsu